César Dávila Andrade (October 5, 1918, in Cuenca, Ecuador – May 2, 1967) was an Ecuadorian poet and writer.

His works displayed elements of neo-romanticism and surrealism.

He spent much of his life in Caracas, Venezuela.

Works

Poems

Oda al Arquitecto (1946).
Espacio me has vencido (1947).
Catedral salvaje (1951).
Boletín y elegía de las mitas (1956).
Arco de instantes (1959).
En un lugar no identificado (1963).
Conexiones de tierra (1964).

See also

 Luis Costales
 Jorge Enrique Adoum

External links
Consejo Nacional de Cultura de Ecuador
 Ministerio de Relaciones Exteriores de Ecuador
Ecuadorian Dictionary of Biography

20th-century Ecuadorian poets
Ecuadorian male short story writers
Ecuadorian short story writers
1918 births
1967 deaths
People from Caracas
Ecuadorian male poets
20th-century short story writers
20th-century male writers
Ecuadorian expatriates in Venezuela
Death in Caracas